Aqua is a Danish-Norwegian Europop band, best known for their 1997 multi-platinum crossover and novelty single "Barbie Girl". The group formed in 1989 as Joyspeed, and achieved international success around the globe in the late 1990s and early 2000s. The band released three albums: Aquarium in 1997, Aquarius in 2000 and Megalomania in 2011. The group sold an estimated 33 million albums and singles, making them the most profitable Danish band ever.

The group managed to top the UK Singles Chart with three of their singles. The group also caused controversy with the double entendres in their "Barbie Girl" single, with the Barbie doll makers Mattel filing a lawsuit against the group. The lawsuit was finally dismissed by a judge in 2002, who ruled "The parties are advised to chill".

The band's members are vocalists René Dif and Lene Nystrøm, keyboardist Søren Rasted, and guitarist Claus Norreen. During their split, Nystrøm, Dif and Rasted all achieved solo chart success, and Norreen continued in the music industry remixing other artists' material. At a press event on October 26, 2007, the group announced a reunion tour, as well as the release of a compilation album featuring new material. Their third album, Megalomania, was released on 3 October 2011.

Career

1989–1995: Formation and Joyspeed
Aqua's history together dates back to 1989. They were originally called Joyspeed. Claus Norreen and Sóren Rasted met in 1989, and throughout the early 1990s, they wrote songs together. At that time, René Dif was working in the Netherlands as a club DJ, and Rasted and Norreen were starting out as producers. Rasted and Norreen had won a contest and were hired to produce a soundtrack. For some of the songs they hired Dif. The three were brought in to make part of the soundtrack for a little-known film titled Frække Frida og de frygtløse spioner. The recording of the soundtrack began in 1993. After getting along well, the trio decided that they would work together again on a future project. A few months after the film was released, Dif spotted Lene Nystrøm singing on the Norway–Denmark ferry, M/S Peter Wessel. He approached her and hired her as the lead singer of Joyspeed, later renamed Aqua. The formation of Joyspeed was on the basis that both Norreen and Rasted would do the production for the group, with Dif rapping and Nystrøm performing the main vocals. A small Swedish record label signed them in 1994, and their very first single "Itzy Bitzy Spider" was released in Sweden. The single failed to become popular, and after one week at the lower end of the Swedish charts, it disappeared completely. The four were disappointed and canceled their contract with the record label (although the label wanted to keep the group on for further releases).

1996–1998: Aquarium and international breakthrough
With a new manager and no record deal, the group started over, and began to develop their famous bubblegum pop sound. The four began to produce and write melodic, catchy European pop songs, attracting the attention of major label Universal Music Denmark. They renamed themselves Aqua, choosing the name seen on a poster for an aquarium in their dressing room, and eventually accepted Universal Music Denmark's offer of a recording contract in 1996. The group's first release under their new name was "Roses Are Red", a dance song with a distinct pop sound. It was released in Denmark in September 1996, and was expected to break into the Danish top ten. The single far surpassed all expectations set by the label, though, and stayed in the charts for over two months, eventually selling enough copies to be certified platinum. The success of the single was further proven when Aqua received a nomination for "Best Danish Dance Act", although the group did not win.

The instant success of "Roses Are Red" proved to Aqua that their new sound was popular with the public, and as a result their follow-up single followed the same formula. Titled "My Oh My", the single again featured catchy lyrics paired with a soft, melodic beat. Upon its release in February 1997, "My Oh My" broke all Danish sales records by being certified gold within six days. The single went straight to number one in Denmark, and made Aqua a household name in the country. The first two singles proved to Universal Music Denmark that Aqua was a very marketable group, and as a result the label looked to start marketing their music across the continent. Aqua released their debut album Aquarium in Denmark on 26 March 1997. The album contained 11 tracks, including their first two singles and their then upcoming third single "Barbie Girl". Universal Music Group had by now begun to market the group in other countries, releasing "Roses Are Red" in Japan in February 1997 and in various countries across Europe in late 1996. The single had proven popular everywhere it was sold, convincing Universal that the group should not just focus on the Danish market, but instead on the general European market.

Aqua released their third single "Barbie Girl" in May 1997. The song, at first glance, appears to be about the Barbie doll. However, at a second glance, the song contains several sexual overtones, such as "You can brush my hair, undress me everywhere", "You can touch, you can play", and "Kiss me here, touch me there, hanky-panky." Despite complaints about the double meanings in "Barbie Girl", Universal Music released the single around the world in 1997. The release was highly successful, making number one in the United Kingdom for four weeks, in Australia for three weeks, and making the top ten of the Billboard Hot 100, something rarely achieved at the time by European pop acts.

Aqua released their album Aquarium around the world in the autumn of 1997. Although the album sold well, many still wrote the group off as a one-hit wonder. Despite this, and much criticism from the media, Aqua had made their international breakthrough, and were now known around the world. Aqua's follow-up to "Barbie Girl" in Australia, Canada and the United Kingdom was "Doctor Jones", although another single, "Lollipop (Candyman)", was released in the United States through MCA Records. "Doctor Jones" entered at number one in several countries, including the United Kingdom, where it stayed at the top spot for two weeks, and Australia, where it spent seven weeks at #1. "Lollipop (Candyman)" became the group's second Top 40 hit in the US, peaking at #23 on the Billboard Hot 100. The song peaked at #3 in Australia. In Japan both songs were released as a double A-side, and achieved reasonable success in the singles chart.

"Doctor Jones" was followed up by "Turn Back Time", a song which proved to be accepted well by both Aqua fans and critics. The song, unlike all other previous releases, dropped the bubblegum pop sound in favour of a slow, mainstream rhythm. The song was featured on the soundtrack to the film Sliding Doors, and unlike many other Aqua releases achieved a large amount of radio and video airplay. The song became their third single to make it to number one in the United Kingdom. As of 2005, only a handful of other artists have managed to achieve that kind of initial success in the UK (acts that have included Westlife and the Spice Girls). Elsewhere, the song also performed well, including reaching #10 in Australia, however it would not be a success in the US and thus marked the end of Aqua's involvement Stateside.

Aqua's second Danish single, "My Oh My", was resurrected in August 1998. The single was also released in several other European countries where it had not been released initially. Following the release of "Good Morning Sunshine", which achieved limited success, Aqua decided to concentrate on their second album, and on touring around Australia. This marked the end of a period Aqua's fans dubbed the "Aquarium age". The group also released a documentary on 1 December 1998 containing several live performances of songs from the Aquarium album and interviews with the members.

1999–2001: Aquarius, Mattel controversy, and hiatus
Aqua were relatively quiet during 1999, deciding to concentrate on recording Aquarius. According to promotional interviews with the group, over 30 songs were recorded for the album, although eventually only twelve made it onto the final version. The group released their second album Aquarius in February 2000. The album instantly proved popular with their fan base, despite some changes to their sound. Aquarius contained several different musical styles. Tracks such as "Cartoon Heroes" and "Bumble Bees" preserved the pop sound of their debut album. "Cartoon Heroes" was released as the first single, and sold well across Europe and Australia, reaching #1 in Denmark, #7 in the United Kingdom, and #16 in Australia. The song is often best remembered for its music video. Aqua released their follow-up single "Around the World" in June 2000, although it was not as successful as "Cartoon Heroes", peaking at #26 in the UK and #35 in Australia. Despite this, it reached the top spot in Denmark. Although not expected at the time, "Around the World" would be Aqua's final UK single release.

Aqua released "Bumble Bees" as a single in Scandinavia, Europe and Australia, achieving reasonable success. "We Belong to the Sea" followed as a fourth single in even fewer nations, failing to chart in most countries. At one stage, "Freaky Friday" was planned as a potential follow-up single for release in early 2001, but it was cancelled. Aqua then decided that they would concentrate on starting work on their third album, as opposed to releasing further singles from Aquarius. Aqua spent the first few months of 2001 touring around the world, and working on material for their third album. The group also performed at the Eurovision Song Contest 2001, collaborating with the Safri Duo and providing the music during the voting stages of the competition. This performance also caused controversy, as a number of offensive phrases and gestures were added during the performance of "Barbie Girl" (which was involved in a major lawsuit). During a couple of low-key events in Denmark the group performed live versions of songs intended for inclusion on the third album, including "Couch Potato" and "Shakin' Stevens Is a Superstar", the latter a tribute to the 1980s performer Shakin' Stevens. The songs were said to have incorporated a rock sound into their music.

In December 2000, Mattel filed a lawsuit against the group's record label Mattel v. MCA Records, 296 F.3d 894 9th Cir. 2002, claiming that "Barbie Girl" had damaged the reputation of the Barbie brand. Judge Alex Kozinski writing for the United States Court of Appeals for the Ninth Circuit upheld the district court finding the use of Mattel's trademark in "Barbie Girl" fell within the noncommercial use exemption to the Federal Trademark Dilution Act. Judge Kozinski concluded his opinion by writing, "The parties are advised to chill."

2008–2012: Reunion and Megalomania

In 2008, Aqua reunited and promised a 25-concert tour that was to have commenced in the summer. Offers were received by the record company from locations in Denmark, Canada, United States and United Kingdom. Aqua finally performed 8 concerts around Denmark as part of the "Grøn koncert" festival. They released their second greatest hits album on 15 June 2009, which includes 16 old remastered tracks and three new songs: "My Mamma Said", "Live Fast, Die Young", and their first single in eight years, "Back to the 80s", which was released in Denmark on 25 May 2009. "Back to the 80s" debuted at number one in Denmark where it stayed for six weeks, becoming the band's fifth number-one single. It has since been certified platinum by the International Federation of the Phonographic Industry (IFPI) for sales of 30,000 copies in Denmark. Aqua has also toured Scandinavia between May and August 2009 and performed at several gigs in Germany, United Kingdom and France. The greatest hits album was released in North America and many European countries on 22 September 2009 and in the UK on 29 September 2009.

Aqua commenced the recording of Megalomania at the beginning of 2010, scheduled for a release in the spring of 2011. Aqua released the album's lead single, "How R U Doin?" on 14 March 2011, after a preview of the song was posted onto the band's official Facebook page on 10 March 2011. Co-written by Thomas Troelsen, the song peaked at number four in Denmark, becoming the band's tenth top-ten single. It has since been certified gold by the International Federation of the Phonographic Industry for sales of 15,000 copies in Denmark. Aqua were originally set to release their third studio album on 14 July 2011, however the release was pushed back to 5 September 2011 with the record label citing bad timing. The album, titled Megalomania, was then further rescheduled to be released on 3 October 2011. On 7 September 2011, Aqua released a preview of their new single, "Playmate to Jesus", on their official Facebook page, which was released on 12 September 2011. On 8 September 2011, it was announced that "Like a Robot" would also be released as a single on 12 September, and would battle against "Playmate to Jesus" in the charts. After the moderate chart success of Megalomania in Denmark, an expanded version of the band featuring all four original members (Lene Nystrøm Rasted, René Dif, Søren Rasted, Claus Norreen), plus new additions Niels Lykke Munksgaard Rasmussen (guitar) Frederik Thaae (bass) and Morten Hellborn (drums), toured Australia in March 2012. They initially announced six concerts but quickly added three additional shows to Melbourne, Sydney and Perth (Fremantle) due to popular demand. Aqua appeared on Sunrise, an Australian morning TV show on the Seven Network. They performed a slower tempo acoustic version of "Barbie Girl" and it was revealed that Lene had pneumonia, but the concerts would proceed as the group pride themselves on never having cancelled a show. They then appeared on the Seven Network's The Morning Show, performing "Doctor Jones". After the tour, the band split again.
In 2014, the band announced a tour in Australia and New Zealand.

2016–present: Second reunion
In September 2016, it was announced that Aqua will perform "at least 10 concerts" as part of the Vi Elsker 90'erne ("We Love the '90s") music festival. It was the first time Aqua performed live in Denmark since 2011. On 20 September 2016, Aqua announced that Claus Norreen would not return to the group. Norreen said in a statement that his "musical focus" has changed and that he no longer desires to tour with Aqua, but still considers the remaining members of Aqua "his family".

On 29 May 2018, Aqua announced "The Rewind Tour" in Canada, with fellow '90s acts Prozzäk and Whigfield.  In June 2018, Aqua released their single called "Rookie".

In July 2021 the band released a cover of "I Am What I Am" for Copenhagen Pride 2021.

On 29 April 2022 during a concert in Tivoli, Copenhagen, the band announced that they would be going on a tour that would continue through 2023.

Musical style and influence
Their influences include ABBA, Ace of Base, and C+C Music Factory. Aqua followed a more traditional verse-chorus structure. Usually, the verse would consist of Lene starting and finishing, while René would sing in the middle.

Aqua are best known for the dance tracks such as "Barbie Girl", "Doctor Jones", "Lollipop (Candyman)", and "My Oh My"; however, they also made slower tracks such as "Turn Back Time", "Good Morning Sunshine", and "We Belong to the Sea". There are also differences between the first album Aquarium and the second album Aquarius; Aquarium had many similar tracks whereas Aquarius experimented with acoustic instruments and genres like country and Latin music.

Awards and nominations

Members
Current members
 René Dif – vocals (1994–2001, 2008–2012, 2016–present)
 Lene Nystrøm – vocals (1994–2001, 2008–2012, 2016–present)
 Søren Rasted – keyboards, piano, guitar, bongos, backing vocals (1994–2001, 2008–2012, 2016–present)

Former members
 Claus Norreen – guitar, keyboards, keytar, backing vocals (1994–2001, 2008–2012, 2016)

Touring and session members
 Steffen Drak – guitar, keyboards (2016–present)

Discography

Aquarium (1997)
Aquarius (2000)
Megalomania (2011)

See also
Toy-Box

References

Bibliography and videography
Aqua: The Official Book, Jacqui Swift, Billboard Books, 1998, 
The Aqua Diary, a 1998 VHS release
The Official Single/Album Charts of the UK, US, Japan, Australia, Denmark and various other countries

External links

 Aqua at Bubblegum House!
 Official web site
 Archived copy of René Dif's official website
 Lazy-B's official website 
 BBC article on the Aqua-Mattel lawsuit

 
Danish Eurodance groups
Musical groups established in 1989
Musical groups disestablished in 2001
Musical groups reestablished in 2008
Musical groups disestablished in 2012
Musical groups reestablished in 2016
Musical quartets
Danish pop music groups
Europop groups
MCA Records artists
World Music Awards winners